Richard or Richárd Nagy may refer to:

Richard Nagy (swimmer) (born 1993), Slovak swimmer
Richárd Nagy (footballer, born 1994), Hungarian football player
Richárd Nagy (footballer, born 1995), Hungarian football player
Richárd Nagy (footballer, born 1998), Hungarian football player
Richard Nagy (footballer, born 2000), Slovak football player